The Soulless, formerly known as Ignominious Incarceration, are a metalcore band based in Bath in the south west of England.

History

Formation (2006–2009)
The band formed in the summer of 2006, playing their first gig to an audience of around 20 people.  By their third show, they had replaced Abigail Williams on a tour slot as the main support act for Bring Me the Horizon and were playing to over 400 people. They were named as one of the best new English death metal bands, they have toured with the likes of Trigger the Bloodshed and Bleed From Within, and recorded a 6-track EP.

Two years later, the band signed a worldwide recording contract with extreme metal label Earache Records. They recorded a debut album, Of Winter Born, at Grindstone Studios in Suffolk in September 2008 with producer Scott Atkins (Sylosis, Gama Bomb).
 
Ignominious Incarceration toured, supporting Bring Me the Horizon, Deez Nuts & The Red Shore on the European leg of their tour. In the UK, they played with bands The Argent Dawn and The Eyes of a Traitor. They also toured the UK and Europe with bands Beneath The Massacre and Cryptopsy.

Of Winter Born and name change
Of Winter Born was released by Earache Records on 10 March 2009. A limited edition version included a bonus disc with four additional tracks. Of Winter Born has been described as "...relentless in nature" by Kerrang! magazine; "...an overpowering barrage of old school riffs" by Terrorizer; "...a striking, technically superb brutally memorable debut" by Rock Sound; and "...a taut and satisfying riff-storm that finds its melodic roots" by Revolver. According to Metal Hammer magazine, the band had "...already found the right balance of technique, melody and brutality. While many young metal bands rehash clichés and old school encumbrances, this lot are threatening to be something altogether different and more demanding."

On 23 September 2010, Ignominious Incarceration announced their band's name being changed to The Soulless. The group commented, "We wanted a new name which was easy to remember and say... the name has a dark, edgy feel to it, but is not instantly recognisable as metal and it's easy to say! We feel this represents us a lot better, as well as our new music."

Discography

As Ignominious Incarceration
Deeds of Days Long Gone (EP) (2008)
Of Winter Born (2009)

As The Soulless
Isolated (2011)

Members

Current members
Andy Wardle - Vocals 
Steve Brown - Guitar 
Chris Ball - Bass
Dan Wilding - Drums
Kristan Dawson - Guitar

Former members
Bobby Daniels - Guitar (2009–2010) (Only played live on the Masters Of Metal Tour in 2009)
Danny Guy - Guitar (2008–2009)
Carlos Collier - Guitar (2006–2008)
Sam Bailey - Drums (2006–2010)

References

English death metal musical groups
Musical groups established in 2006